The World Aircraft Vision, also called the Sentinel, is an American STOL amateur-built aircraft, produced by the World Aircraft Company. The aircraft was publicly introduced at Sun 'n Fun in 2012 and production is expected to commence in 2014. It is supplied as a kit for amateur construction or as a complete ready-to-fly aircraft.

Design and development
It also has large clear plastic doors and an enlarged front windshield to enhance visibility.

The aircraft is made from aluminum sheet. The wing is supported by "V" struts and jury struts. The aircraft's recommended engine is the  Rotax 912ULS four-stroke powerplant. The tricycle landing gear is strengthened for rough field operations and includes an adjustable nose strut shock absorber. Electric rudder trim is standard.

Vision kits are fully assembled at the factory and then disassembled for customer delivery and may be shipped painted as well.

As of October 2012, the design appears on the Federal Aviation Administration's list of approved special light-sport aircraft under the name Sentinel.

Operational history
By November 2012 two examples had been registered in the United States with the Federal Aviation Administration under the Sentinel name.

Specifications (Vision)

References

External links

Vision STOL takeoff
Vision STOL Landing

Homebuilt aircraft
Light-sport aircraft
STOL aircraft
High-wing aircraft
Single-engined tractor aircraft